Kartashyovka is a rural locality (a selo) in Prokhorovsky District, Belgorod Oblast, Russia. The population was 176 as of 2010. There are 5 streets.

Geography 
Kartashyovka is located 18 km northwest of Prokhorovka (the district's administrative centre) by road. Suvorovo is the nearest rural locality.

References 

Rural localities in Prokhorovsky District